Porto Suez Sporting Club, also known as Porto El Sokhna SC, is an Egyptian sports club based in Ain Sokhna, Suez, Egypt. The club is mainly known for its football team, which currently plays in the Egyptian Second Division, the second-highest league in the Egyptian football league system.

Egyptian Second Division
Football clubs in Egypt